Beau M. LaFave (born June 27, 1992) is an American politician from Michigan. He was the member of the Michigan House of Representatives from District 108 from 2017 to 2022 and was a candidate for the Secretary of State of Michigan election in 2022. He lost the nomination to Kristina Karamo, who in turn lost the election to incumbent Secretary of State, Jocelyn Benson.

Early life and education 
LaFave was born in Iron Mountain, Michigan. LaFave uses a prosthetic leg due to a disability he has had since birth. He earned a Bachelor of Arts degree in international relations with a specialization in political economy from Michigan State University.  He attended Wayne State University Law School and did not receive a degree, leaving to pursue office as State Representative.

Career 
On November 8, 2016, LaFave was elected as a member of Michigan House of Representatives for District 108. LaFave defeated Scott A. Celello with 52.74% of the votes. On November 6, 2018, as an incumbent, LaFave won reelection. LaFave defeated Bob Romps with 61.64% of the votes.

In January 2020, LaFave open carried his AR-style handgun at the Michigan State Capitol in protest of gun laws proposed by Governor Gretchen Whitmer. Two days later, the gun was stolen from LaFave's home in Lansing, Michigan, along with a .40-caliber handgun.

On November 18, 2020, LaFave introduced House Resolution No. 324 to impeach Governor Whitmer.
The state senate majority leader and state house speaker (both Republicans) opposed calls for impeachment, calling it "shameful".
The resolution was "dead on arrival", as the legislature had been adjourned and was not expected to take action in a lame duck session.

On October 10, 2021, LaFave co-sponsored House Bill 5444 also known as the "fetal heartbeat protection act."

Personal life 
LaFave is Catholic. On September 29, 2020, LaFave tested positive for COVID-19.

See also 
 2016 Michigan House of Representatives election
 2018 Michigan House of Representatives election

References

External links 
 Beau LaFave at ballotpedia.org

1992 births
Living people
American politicians with disabilities
Catholics from Michigan
Republican Party members of the Michigan House of Representatives
Michigan State University alumni
People from Iron Mountain, Michigan
21st-century American politicians